Liberdade River may refer to the following rivers in Brazil:

 Liberdade River (Juruá River)
 Liberdade River (Xingu River)